Olepa is a genus of moths in the family Erebidae. The genus was described by Watson in 1980. Most part of species occur in India and Sri Lanka, though one species was described from Israel.

Species
ricini group:
 Olepa clavatus (Swinhoe, 1885)
 Olepa coromandelica Dubatolov, 2011
 Olepa koslandana Orhant, 1986
 Olepa neumuthi Orhant, 2012
 Olepa ricini (Fabricius, 1775)
 Olepa schleini Witt et al., 2005
 Olepa toulgoeti Orhant, 1986
ocellifera group
 Olepa anomi Orhant, 1986
 Olepa duboisi Orhant, 1986
 Olepa kakatii Orhant, 2000
 Olepa ocellifera (Walker, 1855)

References
 , 2011.: A new Olepa Watson, 1980 Species from South India (Lepidoptera, Arctiidae). Atalanta 42 (1/2): 136–137.
 , 1986: Deuxieme contribution a l'etude des lépidoptères heteroceres du sud-est Asiatique (1.) Le complexe d'especes ricini Fabricius' (Arctiidae: Arctiinae). Bulletin de la Société Sciences Naturelles de France 50: 9-22, Paris.
 , 2000: Un nouvel Olepa de l'Inde (Lepidoptera, Arctiidae, Arctiinae). Lambillionea 100 (2): 269–270, Bruxelles.

Spilosomina
Moth genera